Phyllobius pyri, the common leaf weevil, is a species of broad-nosed weevil belonging to the family Curculionidae subfamily Entiminae.

Description

Phyllobius pyri can reach a length of 5-6.5 mm. The body is stocky, with broad elytra. Antennae and legs are reddish or brown, clubs of antennae are darker or black, sometimes legs and antennae are entirely black. Elytra have a ribbed appearance, they are black or brown, covered with hairlike shiny greyish, golden or coppery scales. This species develops on the fruit trees, mostly pears, on oak, beech and other deciduous trees, feeding on the leaves. Adults can be found from March to July.

Distribution
These broad-nosed weevils are present in most of Europe, in the eastern Palearctic realm, and in the Near East.

Habitat
This species prefers thickets, forest edges, orchards, parks and gardens.

References

  Biolib
 Fauna europaea
 Bioinfo

External links
 Nature Spot
 D. V. Alford Pests of Fruit Crops: A Color Handbook

Entiminae
Beetles of Europe
Articles containing video clips
Beetles described in 1758
Taxa named by Carl Linnaeus